Whitewater Group is an Object-oriented software company in the United States. It was acquired by Symantec on June 9, 1992, for US$3.28 million.

Products 

 Whitewater Resource Editor for Windows (OEMed to Borland which later replaced it with Resource Workshop)
 Actor object-oriented programming language
 Designed and implemented (under contract) OWL 1.0 framework for Borland C++
 Had active Object-oriented design services division

References

Defunct software companies of the United States
Gen Digital acquisitions